Henri "Harry/Harrie" Steevens (born 27 April 1945) is a retired Dutch cyclist who was active between 1960 and 1972. He competed at the 1964 Summer Olympics in the individual road race and finished in 40th place. Two years later he won a silver medal in the team time trial at the 1966 UCI Road World Championships. He also won the Olympia's Tour (1965), Ronde van Limburg (1966) and Amstel Gold Race (1968), as well as individual stages of the Olympia's Tour (1964, 1965, 1966), Vuelta a Andalucía (1968) and Tour de Suisse (1970).

His brother Henk Steevens was also a cyclist.

References

See also
 List of Dutch Olympic cyclists

1945 births
Living people
Olympic cyclists of the Netherlands
Cyclists at the 1964 Summer Olympics
Dutch male cyclists
People from Stein, Limburg
UCI Road World Championships cyclists for the Netherlands
Cyclists from Limburg (Netherlands)
Tour de Suisse stage winners
20th-century Dutch people
21st-century Dutch people